Clark B. Dibble (May 27, 1860 – July 24, 1932) was a Michigan politician.

Political life
He was elected as the Mayor of City of Flint in 1901 for a single 1-year term. He ran for the State Senate, District 13 in 1902 losing to George Barnes.

References

Mayors of Flint, Michigan
1860 births
1932 deaths
Michigan Democrats
20th-century American politicians